Olga Paterova (Cyrillic:  Ольга Патерова) is a politician in Transnistria. She was born in Tiraspol, today the capital of Transnistria, in 1984 in what was then part of the Moldovan SSR. She is the press secretary for the political youth organization Breakthrough (Russian: Proriv).

Along with fellow Breakthrough-leader Alena Arshinova, she was interviewed in December 2005 by Der Spiegel, a German news magazine.

External links 
 Olga Paterova webpage
 Open mike: Youth activists speak out

Youth activists
1984 births
Living people
People from Tiraspol